Cycloneda polita, known generally as the western blood-red lady beetle, polished ladybug, or western spotless ladybird beetle, is a species of lady beetle in the family Coccinellidae. It is found in North America. It has red elytra without spots and a black thorax marked with a white rim and crescents.

References

Further reading

External links

 

Coccinellidae
Articles created by Qbugbot
Beetles described in 1899